Stanley Mills (born 25 October 2003) is an English professional footballer who plays as a winger for Everton.

Career
Mills joined Everton from Leeds United in 2018. In July 2021, he signed his first professional contract, signing a two-year deal. In July 2022, he made the first team squad for a pre-season tour of the USA. The following month, after making his first team debut on tour, he extended his contract until 2025. On 23 August 2022, he made his professional debut as a substitute in a 1–0 win over Fleetwood Town in the EFL Cup.

Personal life
Mills is the son of former England international Danny Mills.

Career statistics

Club

References

External links
 

Living people
2003 births
English footballers
Association football wingers
Everton F.C. players